Route 26, or Highway 26, can refer to:

International
 Asian Highway 26
 European route E26

Australia
 Burwood Highway
 Anzac Avenue

Austria
 Linzer Autobahn

Canada
 Alberta Highway 26
 British Columbia Highway 26
 Manitoba Highway 26
 Ontario Highway 26
 Prince Edward Island Route 26
 Saskatchewan Highway 26

Czech Republic
 I/26 Highway; Czech: Silnice I/26

India
  National Highway 26 (India)

Iran

Ireland
  N26 road (Ireland)

Italy
 Autostrada A26

Japan
 Japan National Route 26
 Hanwa Expressway
 Kinki Expressway

Korea, South
 National Route 26

Montenegro
 R-26 regional road (Montenegro)

New Zealand
 New Zealand State Highway 26

United Kingdom
 British A26 (Maidstone-Newhaven)
 British M26 (Chevening-Wrotham Heath)

United States
 Interstate 26
 U.S. Route 26
 U.S. Route 26N (former)
 New England Interstate Route 26 (former)
 Alabama State Route 26
 Arkansas Highway 26
 California State Route 26
 County Route A26 (California)
 County Route J26 (California)
 County Route S26 (California)
 Colorado State Highway 26
 Delaware Route 26
 Florida State Road 26
 Georgia State Route 26
 Illinois Route 26
 Indiana State Road 26
 Iowa Highway 26
 K-26 (Kansas highway)
 Kentucky Route 26
 Louisiana Highway 26
 Maine State Route 26
 Maryland Route 26
Maryland Route 26C
Maryland Route 26D
Maryland Route 26E
Maryland Route 26F
 Massachusetts Route 26 (former)
 M-26 (Michigan highway)
 Minnesota State Highway 26
 County Road 26 (Dakota County, Minnesota)
 Mississippi Highway 26
Missouri Route 26 (1922) (former)
Missouri Route 26 (1926) (former)
Missouri Route 26 (1950s) (former)
 Nebraska Highway 26 (former)
 Nebraska Spur 26B
 Nebraska Spur 26E
 Nevada State Route 26 (former)
 New Hampshire Route 26
 New Jersey Route 26
 County Route 26 (Bergen County, New Jersey)
 New Mexico State Road 26
 New York State Route 26
County Route 26E (Cayuga County, New York)
 County Route 26 (Chenango County, New York)
 County Route 26 (Clinton County, New York)
 County Route 26 (Franklin County, New York)
 County Route 26 (Greene County, New York)
 County Route 26 (Herkimer County, New York)
 County Route 26 (Jefferson County, New York)
 County Route 26 (Livingston County, New York)
 County Route 26 (Niagara County, New York)
 County Route 26 (Ontario County, New York)
 County Route 26 (Orange County, New York)
 County Route 26 (Otsego County, New York)
 County Route 26 (Rensselaer County, New York)
 County Route 26 (Rockland County, New York)
 County Route 26 (Schoharie County, New York)
 County Route 26 (Schuyler County, New York)
 County Route 26 (Steuben County, New York)
 County Route 26 (Suffolk County, New York)
 County Route 26 (Sullivan County, New York)
 County Route 26 (Washington County, New York)
 County Route 26 (Westchester County, New York)
 County Route 26 (Wyoming County, New York)
 North Carolina Highway 26 (former)
 North Dakota Highway 26 (1926–1927) (former)
 North Dakota Highway 26 (1927–1931) (former)
 Ohio State Route 26
 Oklahoma State Highway 26
 Oregon Route 26 (1932) (former)
 Pennsylvania Route 26
 South Carolina Highway 26 (1920s) (former)
 South Carolina Highway 26 (1930s) (former)
 South Dakota Highway 26
 Tennessee State Route 26
 Texas State Highway 26
 Texas State Highway Spur 26
 Farm to Market Road 26
 Texas Park Road 26 (former)
 Utah State Route 26
 Vermont Route 26
 Virginia State Route 26
 Virginia State Route 26 (1918-1933) (former)
 Washington State Route 26
 West Virginia Route 26
 Wisconsin Highway 26
 Wyoming Highway 26

Territories
 Puerto Rico Highway 26

Uruguay
  Route 26 Gral. Leandro Gómez

See also
List of A26 roads
List of highways numbered 26A
List of highways numbered 26B